Albert Hobson "Silent Al" Clemens (November 1, 1898 – May 19, 1993) was an American football, basketball, and baseball player and coach and college athletics administrator.

Playing career
Clemens  played football, basketball, and baseball at the University of Alabama. He also threw the javelin on the track team.

Football
Clemens was a prominent end for the Alabama Crimson Tide football team. He was captain of the 1921 team under Xen C. Scott and again captain of the 1923 team—the first season under Wallace Wade.

1920
Clemens was chosen All-Southern in 1920 by various selectors.

1921
Clemens was one of only two returning starters in 1921, serving as captain.

1922
Clemens played during one of Alabama's first great victories in 1922, over Penn.

1923
In Wallace Wade's first season as head coach and Clemens' second as captain he was again selected All-Southern.

Coaching career

Huntsville Junior College
Out of university he coached for Huntsville Junior College.

Jacksonville State Teachers College
Before 1930, Clemens was coach and athletic director at the Jacksonville State Teachers College in Jacksonville, Alabama. He boldly scheduled Southern Intercollegiate Athletic Association elevens, and only ever lost two games to junior colleges. Across all sports he won 7 junior college titles in 3 seasons.

Tuscaloosa High
Clemens was head coach and athletic director of the Tuscaloosa High School Black Bears. He took the position in 1930. After 1931 the team had been unbeaten for seven years (63 games). Coach Clemens challenged any high school in the nation to a game.

Vicksburg Central High
He was head coach and athletic director at Vicksburg's Carr Central High "where his teams were the terror of the Big Eight Conference."  Clemens resigned to take the job at Southwestern. He was replaced by former Mississippi State football player Gene Chadwick.

Southwestern
Clemens was coach and athletic director at Southwestern Presbyterian University—now known as Rhodes College—from 1942 to 1950. Eight of his basketball players organized a strike against him in 1950.

References

1898 births
1993 deaths
Alabama Crimson Tide football players
All-Southern college football players
American football ends
Basketball coaches from Alabama
High school football coaches in Alabama
High school football coaches in Tennessee
Jacksonville State Gamecocks athletic directors
Jacksonville State Gamecocks baseball coaches
Jacksonville State Gamecocks football coaches
Jacksonville State Gamecocks men's basketball coaches
People from Scottsboro, Alabama
Players of American football from Alabama
Rhodes Lynx athletic directors
Rhodes Lynx football coaches